"The Yard Went on Forever" is a song recorded by Richard Harris for his second studio album, The Yard Went on Forever (1968).

Track listings and formats
UK commercial 7" single
 A1 "The Yard Went on Forever" – 5:00
 B1 "Lucky Me" – 2:56

Charts

References

1968 singles
1968 songs
Songs written by Jimmy Webb
Dunhill Records singles